Asthenosoma marisrubri ('flexible body of the Red Sea') (Weinberg & De Ridder, 1998) aka Red Sea fire urchin and toxic leather sea urchin , is a relatively common sea urchin with a widespread distribution in the Indo-Pacific, and was till 1998 considered a color variant of Asthenosoma varium. Sea urchins are close relatives of starfish, crinoids, brittle stars and sea cucumbers, all being echinoderms ('spiny skins').

This species grows to 25 cm in diameter, with articulated plates making the test quite flexible and accounting for its binomen. It prefers water temperatures in the range 24 °C – 27 °C and depths down to 90m. It subsists on a great variety of food including algae, coral polyps and bottom detritus. It is most active at night and is named for the extreme pain inflicted by its spines and its occurrence in the Red Sea.

It often affords shelter to the commensal shrimps Allopontonia iaini, Periclimenes colemani, and the parasitic gastropod Leutzenia asthenosomae. It is found in habitats such as lagoons, external reefs, and sandy or stony bottoms.

References

External links
 

marisrubri
Animals described in 1998